Skelton is a ghost town community in Montgomery Township, Gibson County, Indiana. The town would be completely inside the grounds of the Gibson Generating Station if it existed still. No part of the town exists as most of what was Skelton is in Gibson Lake.

Skelton was laid out in 1911.

Geography

References

Unincorporated communities in Gibson County, Indiana
Unincorporated communities in Indiana